Fildes Point is a point which forms the north side of Neptunes Bellows, the entrance to Port Foster, Deception Island, in the South Shetland Islands of Antarctica. Deception Island was known to sealers in the area as early as 1821; the point was later named for Robert Fildes, a British sealer in these waters at that early time.

See also 
Stanley Patch

References 

Headlands of the South Shetland Islands
Geography of Deception Island